The Parliamentary Services Act 1963 (abbreviated PSA) was an act providing for the Parliament of Malaysia to conduct its own administration, staffing and financing. The act was repealed in 1992 after the then Speaker of the Dewan Rakyat (the lower house of Parliament), Zahir Ismail unilaterally had it removed from the books.

However, a majority of Members of Parliament (MPs) called for the act to be revived in October 2005, when the issue of separation of powers was ignited in the Dewan Rakyat by opposition leader Lim Kit Siang of the Democratic Action Party (DAP). Earlier, Minister in the Prime Minister's Department in charge of parliamentary affairs, Nazri Aziz had announced the setting up of the post of Head of Administration for Parliament and (varyingly) a Department or Office of Parliament, to handle affairs such as maintenance and assistance for MPs. One MP from the ruling Barisan Nasional coalition exasperatedly decried the amount of red tape required for MPs to hire research assistants, and another stated he was forced to use online websites such as Wikipedia for his research.

However, the MPs agreed that the post of Head of Administration for Parliament was unnecessary interference in Parliament's financial affairs, and asked for the restoration of the Parliamentary Services Act so Parliament could run its own affairs independent of the government. Since 1992, government agencies such as the Public Services Department and Treasury had been staffing and maintaining Parliament, as the parliamentary service advisory committee had been disbanded in the wake of the act's repeal.

Nazri insisted that the PSA would have to pass muster through both the Dewan Rakyat and Dewan Negara (upper house of Parliament; also referred to as the Senate) House Committees before it could come to a vote in Parliament itself. This angered the MPs, and Shahrir Abdul Samad, the chairman of the Barisan Nasional Back-Benchers Club (BNBBC) called for all MPs in favour of immediately restoring the PSA to rise. A vast majority of MPs present rose, with some notable exceptions such as Nazri and Foreign Minister Syed Hamid Albar, who had campaigned for the act's repeal in 1992.

Some were skeptical of how much effect reviving the act would have on Parliamentary independence; Nazri argued he couldn't "see any less independence among MPs in the last 13 years without the PSA", and constitutional scholar Shad Saleem Faruqi called it a "merely symbolic gesture". Shahrir himself reportedly acknowledged the PSA's repeal had not made a serious impact on Parliamentary independence.

Structure
The Parliamentary Services Act 1963 was consisted of 8 sections.

References
Ahmad, Abdul Razak (Oct. 23, 2005). "Fighting to get the House in order". New Straits Times, p. 18.
Lim, Kit Siang (2005). "Sorry I was wrong, there is still no light at the end of the tunnel". Retrieved Nov. 5, 2005.
Rusli, Veena & Masitom, Nurul Hazren (Oct. 18, 2005). "'Parlimen bukan kongsi gelap'". Berita Harian, p. 8.

Parliament of Malaysia
1963 in law
Repealed Malaysian legislation
1963 in Malaysia